Hunstein's mannikin or mottled munia (Lonchura hunsteini) is a species of estrildid finch breeding in New Ireland and New Hannover. This species is also introduced to Pohnpei. It has an estimated global extent of occurrence of 20,000 to 50,000 km2. It is found in subtropical/ tropical (lowland) dry grassland habitat. The status of the species is evaluated as Least Concern. The males are similarly colored to the extinct Hawaiian Ula Ai Hāwane, a Hawaiian honeycreeper.

There are two subspecies:

 L. h. hunsteini (Finsch, 1886) – New Ireland (Bismarck Archipelago)
 L. h. nigerrima (Rothschild & Hartert, 1899) – New Hanover  (Bismarck Archipelago)

The race L. h. nigerrima, the New Hanover mannikin, has sometimes been treated as a separate species.

References

BirdLife Species Factsheet

Hunstein's mannikin
Birds of New Ireland Province
Hunstein's mannikin